South Carolina Highway 557 (SC 557) is a  primary state highway in the U.S. state of South Carolina. It serves as a connector route between Clover and Lake Wylie.

Route description

SC 557 is a two-lane rural highway that traverses  from SC 55 near Clover to SC 49/SC 274 in Lake Wylie. The highway provides travelers a more direct route to and from Charlotte. Though it runs physically west-to-east, it is signed as a north-south highway with its western end as its southern terminus and vice versa.

History

The highway was established in 1942 as a renumbering of SC 59.  The route has changed little since.

Major intersections

See also

References

External links

SC 557 at Virginia Highways' South Carolina Highways Annex

557
Transportation in York County, South Carolina